Joseph Leach (born 30 October 1990) is an English cricketer who plays for Worcestershire. Leach is a right-handed batsman who bowls right-arm medium. He was born in Stafford, Staffordshire, and was educated at Shrewsbury School.

Career
Leach made his debut for Staffordshire against Buckinghamshire in the 2008 Minor Counties Championship. The following season he made a further appearance in that competition for the county, against Northumberland at Osborne Avenue, Jesmond. He also made a single appearance in the MCCA Knockout Trophy in 2009 against Suffolk. Leach joined Shropshire in 2010, making his debut for the county in the MCCA Knockout Trophy against Cumberland. 

While studying French and Philosophy at the University of Leeds, Leach made his first appearance for Leeds/Bradford MCCU in 2011. The England and Wales Cricket Board conferred first-class status on Leeds/Bradford MCCU in 2012, with Leach making his first-class debut against Surrey at The Oval. In Surrey's first-innings of 385 all out, Leach took figures of 4/78 from thirteen overs, the best bowling figures of the innings. In Leeds/Braford MCCU's first-innings response, Leach was dismissed for a duck by Tom Jewell. In their second-innings, he recorded his maiden first-class half century with a score of exactly 50, before being dismissed by Tim Linley. Leeds/Bradford MCCU narrowly lost the match by 2 runs. 

Leach played grade cricket in ACT for North Canberra Gungahlin Cricket Club during 2016-2017 season

He has developed into a key member of Worcestershire's squad, becoming a first-team regular in 2015. In 2016 he was appointed county captain.

References

External links

1990 births
Living people
Sportspeople from Stafford
People educated at Shrewsbury School
Alumni of the University of Leeds
English cricketers
Staffordshire cricketers
Shropshire cricketers
Leeds/Bradford MCCU cricketers
Worcestershire cricketers